Pella is one of the regional units of Greece, in the geographic region of Macedonia. It is part of the Region of Central Macedonia. It is named after the ancient city of Pella, the capital of ancient Macedonia and the birthplace of Alexander the Great. The capital of Pella is Edessa with a population of 19,036 inhabitants according to the census of 2011, while the largest town is Giannitsa. Other towns  include Aridaia, Skydra, Arnissa and Krya Vrysi.

Administration
According to the 2011 census the population of the regional unit of Pella was 139,680. It is subdivided into 4 municipalities. These are:

Almopia (2)
Edessa (1)
Pella (3)
Skydra (4)

Prefecture

As a part of the 2011 Kallikratis government reform, the regional unit of Pella was created out of the former prefecture Pella. The prefecture had the same territory as the present regional unit. At the same time, the municipalities were reorganised, according to the table below.

Provinces 
The former prefecture of Pella was subdivided into the following provinces:

Note: Provinces no longer hold any legal status in Greece.

Geography
Mountainous areas surrounding Pella are the Voras Mountains (with Kaimaktsalan reaching a height of 2,524m), Mount Vermion (2,027m), Mount Paiko (1,458m), Mount Tzenna  (2,182m) and Mount Pinovo (2,154m). The main plains are Pozar in the north and the vast plain of Giannitsà in the southeastern part. Other natural features of the area include Lakes Vegoritida and Agra, and Rivers Loudias and Edessian. Pella's southernmost portion is flat and in ancient times, it was a gulf connected to the Aegean Sea. Pella has surface and groundwater resources. There are a number of archaeological sites in the area.

Pella borders the regional units of Kilkis to the northeast, Thessaloniki to the east, Imathia to the south, Kozani to the southwest, by Lake Vegoritida to the southwest,  and by Florina to the west.  To the north, it is bounded by the national border between Greece and North Macedonia.

History

In antiquity, the area around the modern Pella regional unit was part of the ancient Greek Kingdom of Macedon.  It later became part of  the Roman Empire and later the Byzantine and the Ottoman Empires.  Following approximately 500 years of Ottoman rule, it rejoined Greece in 1913, following the Balkan Wars.

Tourism
Ancient Pella and Archaeological Museum of Pella: The capital of ancient Macedonia and birthplace of Alexander the Great. A number of archaeological findings are housed in the Palace and the New Museum.
Loudias River
Waterfalls in the city of Edessa 
Five spa gush along the warm river, which continues to flow in the basin of Almopia.
Kaimakchalan ski resort: Mount Kaimakchalan or Vorras is the third largest in height mount in Greece (altitude 2,524 m). There is a ski area with 16 ski slopes. At the foot of the mountain there is the village of Agios Athanasios.
Giannitsa Ottoman monuments: At the city of Giannitsa there are a lot of buildings from the Ottoman period like the Clock Tower, Mausoleum and baths of Gazi Evrenos, House of Emin Bey, The Baths and the mausoleum of Ahmet Bey, Mosque of Sheikh Ilachi, Mosque of Iskender Bey.

Agriculture
The southern part of the regional unit has a number of orchards.  While agriculture once represented its main industry, today, manufacturing, services and other businesses dominate about 70% of its industry.

Transport
GR-1 (old highway), SE
GR-2/E90, W, SW, Cen., E, SE
Edessa - Verroia road, S
 Thessaloniki-Giannitsa-Edessa

See also
List of settlements in the Pella regional unit
Former toponyms of places in Pella Prefecture

References

External links
Official website of the prefecture of Pella
Map & info of Pella Prefecture
Tzena - Pinovo - East Voras terrain map by Geopsis

 
Prefectures of Greece
1930 establishments in Greece
Regional units of Central Macedonia

nn:Pélla